Khao Phanom is a district (amphoe) in Krabi province, Thailand.

History
The minor district (king amphoe) was created on 1 December 1967 by combining tambons Khao Phanom, Khao Din, and two villages of Khok Yang of Mueang Krabi district and tambon Sin Pun from Khlong Thom district. It was upgraded to a full district on 29 June 1973.

Geography
Neighboring districts are (from the north clockwise): Chai Buri and Phrasaeng of Surat Thani province; Thung Yai of Nakhon Si Thammarat province; and Lam Thap, Khlong Thom, Nuea Khlong, Mueang Krabi, Ao Luek, and Plai Phraya of Krabi Province.

The Khao Phanom Bencha National Park protects the forests around Phanom Bencha mountain, which at 1,397 m is the highest elevation in Krabi Province.

Administration
The district is divided into six subdistricts (tambons), which are further subdivided into 54 villages (mubans). Khao Phanom is a township (thesaban tambon) which covers parts of tambon Khao Phanom. Each tambon has a tambon administrative organization (TAO).

References

External links
amphoe.com

Districts of Krabi province